Acanthomyrmex is a genus of ants in the subfamily Myrmicinae. The genus is known from South East Asia. Its species are dimorphic, with major workers in some genera having heads twice the length (and ten times the volume) than that of the minor workers. They live in small colonies and are rarely collected in the field. There are 17 species of Acanthomyrmex.

List of species

References

External links

 
Ant genera
Hymenoptera of Asia